Terinebrica multidens is a species of moth of the family Tortricidae. It is found in Peru.

The wingspan is about 19.5 mm.  The ground colour of the forewings is olive grey strigulated (finely streaked) up to the middle and along the costa towards the apex. The colour is yellowish cream posteriorly where greyish and pinkish-brown suffusions occur. The hindwings are brownish grey.

Etymology
The species name refers to the dentation of the sterigma and is derived from Latin multum (meaning many).

References

Moths described in 2010
Euliini